The Peace Column (German: Friedenssäule) is a column located in Mehringplatz in Berlin, Germany. Designed by Christian Gottlieb Cantian and erected in 1843, the 19-meter column is topped with a brass status of Victoria, goddess of victory, designed by Christian Daniel Rauch.

See also
 1843 in art

External links
 

1843 establishments in Germany
PeaceColumn
Monumental columns in Germany